360 (three hundred sixty) is the natural number following 359 and preceding 361.

In mathematics

360 is a highly composite number, and one of only seven numbers such that no number less than twice as much has more divisors; the others are 1, 2, 6, 12, 60, and 2520 . 

360 is also a superior highly composite number, a colossally abundant number, a refactorable number, a 5-smooth number, and a Harshad number in decimal, since the sum of its digits (9) is a divisor of 360.

360 is divisible by the number of its divisors (24), and it is the smallest number divisible by every natural number from 1 to 10, except for 7. Furthermore, one of the divisors of 360 is 72, which is the number of primes below it.

360 is the sum of twin primes (171 + 181), and the sum of four consecutive powers of 3 (9 + 27 + 81 + 243). 

The sum of Euler's totient function φ(x) over the first thirty-four integers is 360.

A circle is divided into 360 degrees for the purpose of angular measurement. 360° = 2 π rad is also called a round angle. This choice of unit allows round angle to be divided into equal sectors measured in integer degrees rather than fractional degrees. Many angles commonly appearing in planimetrics have integer number of degrees. For a simple non-intersecting polygon, the sum of the internal angles of a quadrilateral always equals 360 degrees.

References

 Wells, D. (1987). The Penguin Dictionary of Curious and Interesting Numbers (p. 152). London: Penguin Group.

External links

Integers